Richland Township is one of the nineteen townships of Guernsey County, Ohio, United States. As of the 2010 census the population was 2,082, of whom 1,529 lived in the unincorporated portion.

Geography
Located in the southern part of the county, it borders the following townships:
Wills Township - north
Millwood Township - northeast
Wayne Township, Noble County - east
Seneca Township, Noble County - southeast corner
Buffalo Township, Noble County - south
Valley Township - southwest
Jackson Township - west
Center Township - northwest

Two incorporated villages are located in Richland Township: part of Lore City in the north, and Senecaville in the south. Leatherwood Creek flows through the northern part of the township.

Name and history
Richland Township was established in 1810. It is one of twelve Richland Townships statewide.

Government
The township is governed by a three-member board of trustees, who are elected in November of odd-numbered years to a four-year term beginning on the following January 1. Two are elected in the year after the presidential election and one is elected in the year before it. There is also an elected township fiscal officer, who serves a four-year term beginning on April 1 of the year after the election, which is held in November of the year before the presidential election. Vacancies in the fiscal officership or on the board of trustees are filled by the remaining trustees.

References

External links
County website

Townships in Guernsey County, Ohio
Townships in Ohio